Streptomyces gilvifuscus is a Gram-positive and aerobic bacterium species from the genus of Streptomyces which has been isolated from forest soil in Pyeongchang-gun in Korea. Streptomyces gilvifuscus produces antibacterial compounds.

See also 
 List of Streptomyces species

References

External links
Type strain of Streptomyces gilvifuscus at BacDive -  the Bacterial Diversity Metadatabase	

gilvifuscus
Bacteria described in 2015